Myles Harvey Wright (born 14 September 1996) is an English professional footballer who plays as a goalkeeper for Hallam.

Career
Wright made his Football League debut on 4 October 2014, coming on as a 42nd-minute substitute during Chesterfield's 3–2 League One victory against Sheffield United. He replaced Jay O'Shea in a tactical substitution following Tommy Lee's red card.

On 29 August 2015, Wright joined Bradford Park Avenue on an emergency loan. He made his début the same day in the club's 4–4 draw with North Ferriby United. In May 2016, Wright was released by Chesterfield. He joined Buxton following his release.

In June 2022, Wright was confirmed to have joined Hallam.

Career statistics

References

External links

Living people
English footballers
Chesterfield F.C. players
Place of birth missing (living people)
English Football League players
Association football goalkeepers
1996 births
Bradford (Park Avenue) A.F.C. players
Buxton F.C. players
Hallam F.C. players